Cold Blood is a long-standing R&B horn funk band founded by Larry Field in 1968, and was originally based in the East Bay region of the San Francisco Bay Area. The band has also performed and recorded under the name Lydia Pense and Cold Blood, due to the popularity of their lead singer, Lydia Pense.

History
The band first came to prominence in 1969 when rock impresario Bill Graham signed them after an audition, and they played the Fillmore West in San Francisco. Pense has been compared to Janis Joplin, and it was Joplin who recommended the audition to Graham.

The term "East Bay Grease" has been used to describe the San Francisco Bay Area's brass horn heavy funk-rock sound of the 1960s, 1970s and 1980s; Cold Blood was one of the pioneer bands of this sound. Another was Tower of Power. The Tower of Power horn players have performed with Cold Blood on a regular basis since the early 1970s. Skip Mesquite and Mic Gillette have been members of both Tower of Power and Cold Blood.

The band disbanded in the late 1970s. Pense suspended her music career in the early 1980s to raise her daughter Danielle, before re-forming the group in 1988. The band stabilized with its current membership in the 1990s. Cold Blood continues to record and perform today, and some former band members such as Raul Matute (and some from Tower of Power) appear on the band's most recent album.

Cold Blood were featured playing "You Got Me Hummin'" live in Fillmore: The Last Days, a documentary of the last concerts at the Fillmore West auditorium during July 1971.

Personnel

Original band members were founder Larry Field (lead guitar), Lydia Pense (vocals), Danny Hull (tenor saxophone and songwriter), Larry Jonutz (trumpet; born March 15, 1947), Pat O'Hara (trombone; born May 25, 1946 (?), died August 1977 of an overdose), Raul Matute (Hammond organ, piano, arranger and songwriter, born February 19, 1946), Jerry Jonutz (baritone, alto and tenor saxophone; born March 15, 1947), David Padron (trumpet; born May 4, 1946), Rod Ellicott (bass), and Frank Davis, who was replaced on drums by Sandy McKee (real name Cecil James Stoltie, born July 12, 1945, died October 15, 1995) during the Sisyphus sessions.

Current personnel are Pense (vocals), Steve Salinas (keyboards), Steve Dunne (guitar), Mike Morgan (percussion), Evan Palmerston (bass), Rich Armstrong (trumpet, cornet, percussion), Rob Zuckerman (alto, tenor, baritone saxes, and flute) and Donny Baldwin (drums).

Current members
Lydia Pense - vocals
Steve Salinas - keyboards
Steve Dunne - guitar and vocals
Evan Palmerston - bass and vocals
John Halbleib - trumpet, flugelhorn, harmonica
Rob Zuckerman - alto/tenor/bari sax, flute
Dana Moret – vocals
Fred Ross – vocals
T. Moran – drums

Additional personnel
Max Haskett - vocals, trumpet
Bill Atwood - trumpet
Stevie "Keys" Roseman - Hammond B-3 organ
Jim Preston - drums
Michael Sasaki - guitar
Jeff Tamelier - guitar
Tom Poole - horns
Bill Slais - saxophone
Michael White - bass

Former members 
Over the years there have been various incarnations of the band, including singer/trumpet player Max Haskett (born 7 March 1947, died 15 September 1999, ex-Rubicon); Tower of Power horn player Mic Gillette; Journey keyboardist Stevie "Keys" Roseman on Hammond B-3 organ; Sons of Champlin drummer, Jim Preston; Starship drummer T. Moran; guitar player Michael Sasaki (born June 24, 1951); Tower of Power guitarist Jeff Tamelier; Boz Scaggs horn player Tom Poole; Elvin Bishop sax player Bill Slais; bass player Michael White and others.

Michael Sasaki - lead guitar

Peter Welker - lead trumpet
Mic Gillette - horns
Danny Hull - tenor saxophone and songwriter
Larry Jonutz - trumpet
Pat O'Hara - trombone
Raul Matute - Hammond organ, piano, arranger and songwriter
Jerry Jonutz - saxophone
David Padron - trumpet
Rod Ellicott - bass

Frank Davis - drums
Sandy McKee - drums
Alex Sarmiento - bass
Skip Mesquite - tenor sax and vocals
Michael Andreas - tenor sax
Gaylord Birch - drums
Eric Dunan - trumpet
T Moran - Drums
Rob Moitoza - Bass

Discography
Their initial four albums, Cold Blood (produced by David Rubinson), Sisyphus (produced by Fred Catero), First Taste of Sin (produced by Donny Hathaway), and Thriller (produced by David Rubinson), remain their best-known work.

Albums
Cold Blood (1969)
Sisyphus (1970)
First Taste of Sin (1972)
Thriller (1973)
Lydia (1974)
The Best of Cold Blood (1975)
Lydia Pense and Cold Blood (1976), the last album before the band's hiatus
Vintage Blood: Live! 1973 (live album, 2001)
Transfusion (2005)
Lydia Pense & Cold Blood: Live Blood (live album, 2008)
Lydia Pense & Cold Blood, "The River City Sessions" (2011)
Lydia Pense & Cold Blood, "Soul of the Gypsy" (2015)

Chart singles
"You Got Me Hummin'" (1970, No. 52 Pop)
"Too Many People" (1970, No. 107 'Bubbling Under' chart)
"I'm a Good Woman" (1970, No. 125 'Bubbling Under' chart)

References

External links
Official site for Lydia Pense and Cold Blood
 Chronology of San Francisco Rock in the late 1960s

American funk musical groups
Musical groups from Oakland, California